Dichomeris microsphena is a moth in the family Gelechiidae. It was described by Edward Meyrick in 1921. It is found in China (Hong Kong), Taiwan, north-eastern India and Java, Indonesia.

The wingspan is 12.5–14 mm. The forewings have a costal blotch near the middle of the anterior margin and two small discal spots near the middle and at the end of the cell.

The larvae feed on Bridelia ovata.

References

Moths described in 1921
microsphena